Hovgaard Island is an island  long, lying off the northwest coast of Kyiv Peninsula,  southwest of Booth Island in the Wilhelm Archipelago, Antarctica.

It was discovered and named "Krogmann-Insel" (Krogmann Island) by the German 1873–74 expedition under Eduard Dallmann, but the name Hovgaard, after Polar explorer and officer of the Danish Navy Andreas Hovgaard, applied by the Belgian Antarctic Expedition, 1897–99, under Gerlache, has overtaken the original name in usage. The name Krogmann Point has been given to the western extremity of Hovgaard Island.

Hovgaard Island is a popular location for camping in Antarctica among expedition groups due to the presence of a relatively flat campsite along Penola Strait. Campers dig "snow graves" to sleep in. The holes offer protection from the wind.

See also 
 Composite Antarctic Gazetteer
 Guéguen Point
 List of Antarctic islands south of 60° S

References

Islands of the Wilhelm Archipelago